This is a list of year-round and seasonal destinations served by Air Berlin, the former second-largest German airline and former member of the oneworld alliance, as of October 2017. It does not include the routes served on behalf of Eurowings.

In January 2017, Air Berlin announced a much diminished route network for the upcoming 2017 season, with nearly all leisure routes either transferred to Niki or cancelled altogether. Additionally, some domestic and European metropolitan routes were dropped; the remaining network focuses on the hubs at Berlin Tegel Airport and Düsseldorf Airport. Due to ongoing bankruptcy proceedings, all Caribbean destinations were terminated in September 2017 and the remaining long-haul routes were terminated on 15 October 2017.

On 27 October 2017, the company ceased all operations excluding its wetlease agreements.

Destinations before bankruptcy
Air Berlin regularly served the following destinations, which were cancelled either at the closure of operations or before:

Africa
Egypt
Cairo - Cairo International Airport
Hurghada - Hurghada International Airport
Marsa Alam - Marsa Alam International Airport

Morocco
Agadir - Agadir–Al Massira Airport
Marrakech - Marrakesh Menara Airport

Namibia
Windhoek - Hosea Kutako International Airport

South Africa
Cape Town - Cape Town International Airport

Americas
Canada
Vancouver - Vancouver International Airport

Cuba
Havana - José Martí International Airport
Varadero - Juan Gualberto Gómez Airport

Curaçao
Willemstad - Curaçao International Airport

Dominican Republic
Puerto Plata - Gregorio Luperón International Airport
Punta Cana - Punta Cana International Airport

Mexico
Cancún - Cancún International Airport

United States
Boston - Logan International Airport
Chicago - O'Hare International Airport
Fort Myers - Southwest Florida International Airport
Las Vegas - Harry Reid International Airport
Los Angeles - Los Angeles International Airport
Miami - Miami International Airport
New York City - John F. Kennedy International Airport
Orlando - Orlando International Airport
San Francisco - San Francisco International Airport

Asia
China
Beijing - Beijing Capital International Airport
Shanghai - Shanghai Pudong International Airport

Iraq
Sulaimaniyah - Sulaimaniyah International Airport

Israel
Tel Aviv - Ben Gurion Airport

Maldives
Malé - Velana International Airport

Thailand
Bangkok - Suvarnabhumi Airport
Phuket - Phuket International Airport

Turkey
Antalya - Antalya Airport
Bodrum - Milas–Bodrum Airport

United Arab Emirates
Abu Dhabi - Abu Dhabi International Airport
Dubai - Dubai International Airport

Europe
Austria
Graz - Graz Airport
Innsbruck - Innsbruck Airport
Klagenfurt - Klagenfurt Airport
Linz - Linz Airport
Salzburg - Salzburg Airport
Vienna - Vienna International Airport

Bulgaria
Burgas - Burgas Airport
Sofia - Sofia Airport
Varna - Varna Airport

Croatia
Dubrovnik - Dubrovnik Airport
Pula - Pula Airport
Rijeka - Rijeka Airport
Split - Split Airport
Zadar - Zadar Airport

Czech Republic
Prague - Václav Havel Airport Prague

Cyprus
Larnaca - Larnaca International Airport
Paphos - Paphos International Airport

Denmark
Billund - Billund Airport
Copenhagen - Copenhagen Airport

Finland
Helsinki - Helsinki Airport

France
Nice  - Nice Côte d'Azur Airport
Paris
Charles de Gaulle Airport
Orly Airport 

Germany
Berlin
Schönefeld Airport
Tegel Airport Hub
Bremen - Bremen Airport
Cologne/Bonn - Cologne Bonn Airport
Dortmund - Dortmund Airport
Dresden - Dresden Airport
Düsseldorf - Düsseldorf Airport Hub
Erfurt/Weimar - Erfurt-Weimar Airport
Frankfurt - Frankfurt Airport
Friedrichshafen - Friedrichshafen Airport
Hamburg - Hamburg Airport
Hanover - Hannover Airport
Karlsruhe/Baden-Baden - Karlsruhe/Baden-Baden Airport
Leipzig/Halle - Leipzig/Halle Airport
Memmingen - Memmingen Airport
Munich - Munich Airport
Münster/Osnabrück - Münster Osnabrück International Airport
Nuremberg - Nuremberg Airport
Paderborn/Lippstadt - Paderborn Lippstadt Airport
Saarbrücken - Saarbrücken Airport
Stuttgart - Stuttgart Airport
Usedom - Heringsdorf Airport
Weeze - Weeze Airport
Westerland - Sylt Airport
Zweibrücken - Zweibrücken Airport

Greece
Chania - Chania International Airport
Corfu - Corfu International Airport
Heraklion - Heraklion International Airport
Karpathos - Karpathos Island National Airport
Kavala - Kavala International Airport
Kos - Kos International Airport
Mykonos - Mykonos Airport
Mytilene - Mytilene International Airport
Patras - Araxos Airport
Preveza - Aktion National Airport
Rhodes - Rhodes International Airport
Samos - Samos International Airport
Thessaloniki - Thessaloniki Airport
Volos - Volos Airport
Zakynthos - Zakynthos International Airport

Guernsey
Guernsey - Guernsey Airport

Hungary
Budapest - Budapest Ferenc Liszt International Airport

Iceland
Reykjavík - Keflavík International Airport

Italy
Bari - Bari Karol Wojtyła Airport
Bologna - Bologna Guglielmo Marconi Airport
Brindisi - Brindisi Airport
Cagliari - Cagliari–Elmas Airport
Catania - Catania–Fontanarossa Airport seasonal
Florence - Florence Airport
Lamezia Terme - Lamezia Terme International Airport
Milan
Linate Airport
Milan Malpensa Airport
Naples - Naples International Airport seasonal
Olbia - Olbia Costa Smeralda Airport seasonal
Palermo - Falcone Borsellino Airport
Rimini - Federico Fellini International Airport
Rome - Leonardo da Vinci–Fiumicino Airport
Venice - Venice Marco Polo Airport
Verona - Verona Villafranca Airport

Jersey
Jersey Airport

Malta
Luqa - Malta International Airport

Montenegro
Tivat - Tivat Airport

Netherlands
Amsterdam - Amsterdam Schiphol Airport

North Macedonia
Skopje - Skopje International Airport

Norway
Oslo - Oslo Airport, Gardermoen

Poland
Gdańsk - Gdańsk Lech Wałęsa Airport
Kraków - John Paul II International Airport Kraków-Balice
Warsaw - Warsaw Frédéric Chopin International Airport

Portugal
Faro - Faro Airport
Funchal - Madeira Airport
Lisbon - Lisbon Airport
Ponta Delgada - João Paulo II Airport
Porto - Porto Airport
Terceira Island - Lajes Field

Romania
Bucharest - Henri Coandă International Airport

Russia
Kaliningrad - Khrabrovo Airport
Moscow - Domodedovo International Airport
Saint Petersburg - Pulkovo Airport

Serbia
Belgrade - Belgrade Nikola Tesla Airport

Spain
Alicante - Alicante–Elche Miguel Hernández Airport
Arrecife - Lanzarote Airport
Asturias - Asturias Airport
Barcelona - Josep Tarradellas Barcelona–El Prat Airport
Ciudad Real - Don Quijote Airport
Fuerteventura - El Matorral Airport
Ibiza - Ibiza Airport
Las Palmas de Gran Canaria - Gran Canaria Airport
Madrid - Adolfo Suárez Madrid–Barajas Airport
Málaga - Málaga Airport
Menorca - Menorca Airport
Murcia - Murcia San Javier Airport
Palma de Mallorca - Palma de Mallorca Airport
Santa Cruz de la Palma - La Palma Airport
Santiago de Compostela - Santiago de Compostela Airport
Seville - San Pablo Airport
Tenerife - Tenerife South Airport
Valencia – Valencia Airport

Sweden
Arvidsjaur - Arvidsjaur Airport
Gothenburg
Gothenburg City Airport
Göteborg Landvetter Airport
Stockholm - Stockholm Arlanda Airport

Switzerland
Basel - EuroAirport Basel Mulhouse Freiburg
Geneva - Geneva Airport
Zürich - Zürich Airport

United Kingdom
Belfast - Belfast City Airport
Glasgow - Glasgow Airport
London
Gatwick Airport
Stansted Airport
Manchester - Manchester Airport

References

External links
 airberlin.com - Flightplan

Air Berlin
Lists of airline destinations